Yamin Yisrael (lit. Right Israel) was a minor right-wing political party in Israel.

Background
The party was founded on 24 July 1995 when Shaul Gutman broke away from Moledet. It ran in the 1996 elections, but failed to cross the electoral threshold of 1.5% and did not win a seat.

In the 2003 elections the party ran a joint list with Herut – The National Movement. Although together the parties won 36,202 votes (1.1%), they were 8,000 short of the threshold. For the 2006 elections the party ran alongside Baruch Marzel's Jewish National Front, winning 28,824 votes (0.79%) and again failing to cross the threshold.

The party did not run in the 2009 elections.

Ideology
The party's objectives were to:
Replace the current proportional representation system for elections with a constituency-based method.
Institute a presidential system of government.
Presidential appointment of Supreme Court judges.
Enforce the basic law prohibiting parties that negate the Jewish nature of the state
Rescind citizenship of "disloyal" citizens.
Rescind large child allowances.
Rescind the "grandfather clause" of the Law of Return (which allows individuals with a Jewish grandparent, but not recognised halakhically as Jews to claim Israeli citizenship).
Allow Israelis living abroad to vote.
Castigate CNN and the BBC for being "a facade for antisemitism".
Phase out U.S. military aid to Israel.

References

External links
Party history Knesset website

1995 establishments in Israel
Political parties established in 1995
Defunct political parties in Israel
Zionist political parties in Israel
Political parties with year of disestablishment missing